Gunvor Engström, born December 29, 1950, in Betul, India, is Swedish business personality and civil servant. She led Företagarna, a Swedish association of primarily small- and medium-sized businesses and employers, between June 2002 and December 2006. She was appointed County Governor of Blekinge County from 1 September 2008 by the Swedish government, for a period of six years, but resigned in 2011.

Engström has a varied background with experience of private and public companies.

She worked for nine years in the Swedish Government offices.

References

External links
 http://www.gunvorsblogg.se/

Governors of Blekinge County
Swedish businesspeople
1950 births
Living people
Stockholm School of Economics alumni